Blennocampa is a genus of insects belonging to the family Tenthredinidae.

The genus was first described by Hartig in 1837.

Species:
 Blennocampa phyllocolpa

References

Tenthredinidae
Sawfly genera